Strickly For Da Breakdancers & Emceez is an instrumental album produced by rapper KRS-One. It was first recorded and released in 1995 as two separate vinyl records, Strictly For Da Breakdancers and Strictly For Da Emcees (The Goddess Set), released via Front Page Entertainment.

For the first time on CD, KRS-One releases the two instrumental EP's on a 2xCD set through Cleopatra Records. All the music included is produced and arranged by KRS-One and engineered by Commissioner Gordon.

Track listing
CD No. 1: Strictly For Da Breakdancers
Steady Bounce
Wanna Battle
Warm Up
Yes, Yes, Y'all
Venus
Nute
Tiamot
Asherah
Isis
A Moment of Silence

CD No. 2: Strictly For Da Emcees
Hera (More Chicken Shit)
Aphrodite
Eve
Shiva
I Love Simone
Walking Away
KRS Loves Simone
Stick Up
Some Live Shit from the East Coast
Some Live Shit from the West Coast

KRS-One albums
2008 compilation albums
Hip hop compilation albums
Cleopatra Records albums